Macfarlanes LLP is a corporate law firm headquartered in London, United Kingdom. It advises national and multinational companies, business leaders and high-net-worth individuals in the UK and internationally across the full range of corporate and commercial matters as well as on their private affairs.

In 2019/20, Macfarlanes achieved total revenues of £237.7 million and profits per equity partner of £1.91 million, respectively the 28th-largest and 2nd-highest among UK-based law firms in that year. It is regarded as forming part of the "Silver Circle" of leading UK law firms.

History 
Macfarlanes was founded in the City of London in 1875 by George Watson Neish. In 1894 Neish was joined in partnership by John Embleton Macfarlane and the firm moved to premises in Watling Street. The firm's offices suffered bomb damage during the Second World War. In 1958, the firm moved to a new office, Dowgate Hill House. In 1962, the firm adopted its current name Macfarlanes, named after then-senior partner Craig Macfarlane. The firm has grown organically over the years to its current size and has never merged.

Vanni Treves was the firm's senior partner from 1987 to 1999.
Macfarlanes converted to a limited liability partnership in May 2008.

In September 2010, Macfarlanes advised Four Seasons Health Care, the largest UK-based care home group, on the restructuring of its £1.6 billion debt facilities. In October 2010 the firm announced that it would be introducing a new senior solicitor level from early 2011. In July 2012 Macfarlanes advised Stanhope, backed by Mitsui Fudosan UK and the Alberta Investment Management Corporation, on its purchase of the BBC Television Centre.

In January 2012, Macfarlanes was joined by a nine-strong team from the boutique specialist hedge fund law firm, D Harris & Co International Limited, to complement the firm’s existing hedge funds practice.

In September 2013, Macfarlanes advised Verizon Communications on its acquisition of Vodafone's 45 per cent interest in Verizon Wireless for $130 billion, one of the biggest deals in corporate history.

It was named Law Firm of the Year at the British Legal Awards 2014 and UK Law Firm of the Year 2015 at the Chambers Europe Awards for Excellence.

Main practice areas

Macfarlanes' main practice areas are:

List of senior partners

 Herbert James (1984-1987)
 Vanni Treves (1987-1999)
 Robert Sutton (1999-2008)
 Charles Martin (2008-2020)
 Sebastian Prichard Jones (2020-)

Notable alumni
Notable alumni of Macfarlanes include:

David Gauke, Conservative MP and former Lord Chancellor and Secretary of State for Justice
Sir David Tang, noted socialite (joined as a trainee solicitor, but left before completing his training contract)
Vanni Treves CBE, former senior partner of the firm and chairman of Channel Four Television Corporation

References

External links 
Macfarlanes website

Law firms of the United Kingdom
Law firms established in 1875
1875 establishments in the United Kingdom